The 2019–20 season was the 55th season in 1. FC Union Berlin's history and their first season in the top flight of German football, the Bundesliga, having been promoted from the 2. Bundesliga in 2019. In addition to the domestic league, Union Berlin also participated in the season's edition of the domestic cup, the DFB-Pokal. Since their foundation, Union have played in the Stadion An der Alten Försterei, located in Berlin, Germany. The season covered a period from 1 July 2019 to 30 June 2020.

Season review

Pre-season
On 27 May 2019, Union Berlin gained promotion to the Bundesliga for the first time in the club's history, following a 2–2 draw over two legs against VfB Stuttgart, in which Union triumphed on the away goals rule. Following promotion, Union Berlin made 14 signings, including signing Marvin Friedrich, the scorer of the deciding goal against Stuttgart, for €2.5 million from FC Augsburg. The club contested eight pre-season friendlies, winning five, drawing two and losing one.

Bundesliga first half (matchday 1–17)
Union Berlin's first ever Bundesliga game came against rivals RB Leipzig on 18 August 2019, losing 4–0. The club's oldest ultras group, the Wuhlesyndikat, successfully called for a 15-minute silent protest at the start of the game, aimed in protest at Leipzig's ownership model. Six days later, the club picked up their first Bundesliga point, drawing 1–1 away at FC Augsburg, with forward Sebastian Andersson scoring Union Berlin's first ever Bundesliga goal. On matchday 3, Union Berlin gained their first ever Bundesliga win, in a shock 3–1 home victory against UEFA Champions League outfit Borussia Dortmund. During the first five matchdays, International Centre for Sports Studies research concluded that Union Berlin had the highest average height across the top 31 European first divisions. On 2 November 2019, Union Berlin recorded their third Bundesliga win of the season, thanks to a 1–0 home win against Berlin rivals Hertha BSC; the first meeting between the pair in the top flight of German football. Despite Sebastian Polter scoring a late winner from the penalty spot, the game was not without controversy, as referee Deniz Aytekin temporarily halted the game, following fireworks from the away section entering the home sections and the field of play. Following full-time, Rafał Gikiewicz won praise from fans and media alike, after helping prevent a minor pitch invasion from a section of Union Berlin ultras, aimed at attacking Hertha supporters, after Union Berlin flags, shirts and scarves were burnt in the away end during the game. The win lifted Union to 14th place in the Bundesliga table, three points above the relegation play-off place.

On 23 November 2019, Union Berlin recorded their fourth consecutive competitive win, following a 2–0 victory over Bundesliga leaders Borussia Mönchengladbach, with second half goalscorer Andersson sitting at fourth in the Bundesliga scoring charts following the win. At the halfway point of the season, Union sat in eleventh place, one place and one point above city rivals Hertha BSC.

Bundesliga second half (matchday 18–34)

During the January transfer winter, Union Berlin made one signing, loaning Yunus Mallı in from VfL Wolfsburg until the summer. On matchday 19, Union Berlin recorded their first win after the winter break, following a 3–1 loss to RB Leipzig a week prior, after defeating Augsburg 2–0, with Neven Subotić scoring his first goal for the club. On 1 March 2020, Sebastian Andersson scored his tenth Bundesliga goal of the season in a 2–2 home draw against VfL Wolfsburg, ending an eight game long drought. The game was suspended for over ten minutes during the first half, after protests from Union Berlin's fans against TSG 1899 Hoffenheim's owner Dietmar Hopp in solidarity with Bayern Munich, Borussia Dortmund and 1. FC Köln supporters, who had all protested against Hopp's involvement with Hoffenheim on the same weekend. On 4 March 2020, Union Berlin were knocked out of the DFB-Pokal at the quarter final stage, in a 3–1 loss against Bayer Leverkusen.

Ahead of matchday 26, the Bundesliga was suspended, owing to the COVID-19 pandemic in Germany, with the Deutsche Fußball Liga recommending a suspension until 2 April 2020. The second Berlin derby of the season, originally scheduled for 21 March 2020, was due to be played behind closed doors following advice from the Bundesministerium für Gesundheit, but was later postponed following the Bundesliga's suspension until 2 April. In mid-April, clubs returned to training. On 7 May 2020, the Deutscher Fußball-Bund announced resumption of the Bundesliga without spectators in mid-May, with the final weekend of the season set to be played on 27 June 2020. On 17 May 2020, after six Bundesliga matchday 26 games were played a day prior, Union Berlin lost 2–0 at home to Bayern Munich behind closed doors. On 22 May 2020, Hertha BSC played Union Berlin at the Olympiastadion behind closed doors in the second Berlin derby of the season, winning 4–0; the biggest competitive victory between the pair.

Players

Squad information

Transfers

Summer

In:

Out:

Winter

In:

Out:

Friendly matches

Competitions

Overview

Bundesliga

League table

Results summary

Results by round

Matches
The Bundesliga schedule was announced on 28 June 2019.

DFB-Pokal

Squad and statistics

! colspan="13" style="background:#DCDCDC; text-align:center" | Players transferred out during the season
|-

|}

Notes

References

1. FC Union Berlin seasons
Berlin, Union